

See also
List of heritage railway stations in the United Kingdom

External links
 List of National Rail Station codes. National Rail covers railways in Great Britain only. Stations in Northern Ireland are not listed.

B